Roman Mykhailovych Lozynskyi (born 20 January 1994) is a Ukrainian politician and public figure, People's Deputy of Ukraine., First Deputy Head of the Committee on Service, Local Self-Government, Regional Development and Urban Planning of the Verkhovna Rada of Ukraine (Ukraine's parliament), a member of Euronest Parliamentary Assembly. A former chairman of the Ukrainian Galician Party and a former member of the "Holos" ("Voice") political party. On 29 July 2021 Voice expelled Lozynskyi from the party.

In addition to his political career, he is a member of such public organizations as Plast - National scout organization of Ukraine and Running Ukraine, triathlete, marathon runner, сo-founder of the educational project "Young Elite School" in Lviv.

Education 
He studied at a specialized school №28 with an in-depth study of the German language in Lviv.

In 2015, he graduated from Ivan Franko National University of Lviv, in Political science, and received a bachelor’s degree.

In the same year, he successfully passed the program "Political Studies: everything a future deputy needs to know" at the Institute of Leadership and Management of the Ukrainian Catholic University.

In 2016, he completed the Higher Political School program at the Centre of Political Studies and Analytics in Kyiv.

In 2017, he received a master's degree (MPA) from the School of Public Administration of the Ukrainian Catholic University.

Political activity 
In 2015, as a student, Lozynskyi  joined the Ukrainian Galician Party.

In the 2015 Ukrainian local elections, Lozynskyi  ran for the Lviv City Council of the 7th convocation from the Ukrainian Galician Party in constituency 46. He was not elected. He took second place in his district with a rating of 8.9%. In the intra-party rating, he took the 7th place out of 41.

Since 2015, Lozynskyi is an Assistant to the Deputy of the Lviv City Council Yulia Hvozdovych, Chairman of the Commission on Legality, Deputy Activity, and Freedom of Speech.

In 2016, Lozynskyi did an internship in the office of Borys Wrzesnewskyj, a member of the three convocations of the House of Commons of Canada from the Liberal Party.

2015-2017 — Deputy Chairman of the Lviv city organization Ukrainian Galician Party.

2017-2018 — Deputy Chairman of the Ukrainian Galician Party and head of the party secretariat. As a deputy, Roman Lozynskyi introduced expert groups in the party — special commissions that professionally investigate key issues to eliminate populism.

In March 2018, he became chairman of the Political Council of the Ukrainian Galician Party.

In the summer of 2019 the Ukrainian Galician Party and the Voice agreed to cooperate in the framework of the parliamentary campaign. In the 2019 Ukrainian parliamentary election he was the coordinator of the Voice party in the Lviv region.

On August 29, 2019, Roman Lozynskyi became a People's Deputy of Ukraine (number 15 in the Voice`s party list).

In April 2020 he launched a campaign demanding the continuation of blocking Russian social networks in Ukraine (such a VKontakte, Odnoklassniki, Mail.ru, etc.). On May 13 he collected the signatures of 156 people's deputies for holding an extraordinary sitting of the Verkhovna Rada to adopt a resolution on continuing to block social networks. On the same day, the Verkhovna Rada voted 252 deputies in favor of draft Resolution # 3319 on the extension of sanctions. The next day, the President of Ukraine signed a decree, which extended the sanctions and, accordingly, the blocking of Russian social networks in Ukraine by Internet providers.

At the end of August 2020 Russia imposed sanctions on Roman Lozynskyi.

In June 2021, 11 Voice MPs formed a breakaway group called Justice (Spravedlyvist), among them all (so also Lozynskyi) Ukrainian Galician Party members.

On 29 July 2021, Voice expelled Lozynskyi from the party, the party claimed he could not be part in their "political force in the future".

References 

Voice (Ukrainian political party) politicians
Ninth convocation members of the Verkhovna Rada
1994 births
University of Lviv alumni
Ukrainian Catholic University alumni
Ukrainian political scientists
Living people